The Samuel Orton Harrison House, located in West Caldwell in Essex County, New Jersey, United States, was selected for inclusion in the Historic American Buildings Survey (1937) as significantly representative of Greek Revival architectural style. The dwelling was built between 1830 and 1840 and remained in possession of Mrs. Hannah Harrison until 1946 when the property was sold to historic preservationist Raymond Dey. At the time of sale the structure was virtually unchanged from its initial build. Dey subsequently performed renovations and minor alterations to the first floor plan to enable continued use as a private residence. Under subsequent ownership the house was placed on the National Register of Historic Placeson October 26, 1979.

The property came under threat as the estate of the late Sandford Cole was being probated during the peak of a highly speculative real estate market in 2007. The town, eager to reassert manifest destiny and rid itself of an albatross of history, quickly approved demolition. The structure was razed without notice much to the sadness of many local residents.

As for Timothy Cole's share of the estate, it has since been largely dissipated in the securities markets by the estate managers for the late Sandford S. Cole.

See also 
 National Register of Historic Places listings in Essex County, New Jersey

References

 HABS NJ,7-CALDW,3- Historic American Buildings Survey
 Library of Congress, Prints and Photograph Division, Washington, D.C. 20540 USA
 Last Will and Testament - Sandford S. Cole
 The Caldwell Progress Newspaper
 Essex County Coroners Office
 West Caldwell Historical Society
 West Caldwell Police Department
 New Jersey Department of Motor Vehicles - Licensing Bureau

Houses on the National Register of Historic Places in New Jersey
Houses in Essex County, New Jersey
New Jersey Register of Historic Places
West Caldwell, New Jersey